Jarra may refer to
 Jarra Central, one of the six districts of the Lower River Division of the Gambia
 Jarra East, one of the six districts of the Lower River Division of the Gambia
 Jarra West, one of the six districts of the Lower River Division of the Gambia
 Jarra (wasp), a genus in subfamily Doryctinae

See also
 Jarrah (disambiguation)
 Jarrow, a community in England